Skyview on the Ridge is a future redevelopment of a shopping mall located in Irondequoit, New York, a suburb of Rochester. The mall opened in 1990 as Irondequoit Mall, featuring anchors McCurdy's, Sibley's, J. C. Penney, and Sears. 

On January 22, 2016, Angelo Ingrassia, a local real estate developer who specializes in developing premier properties, purchased the center.

On August 29, 2017, current owner Angelo Ingrassia announced a plan to construct an office park along with retail, a community center, as well as a large residential component. The development is named Skyview on the Ridge.

On July 30, 2019, the Town of Irondequoit approved a referendum that would allow the town to move forward by borrowing $7.25 million to build a community center.

History 
Wilmorite Properties first announced plans for Irondequoit Mall in June 1985, and by May 1988, the first three anchor stores were confirmed: Sears, J. C. Penney, and Sibley's, which became Kaufmann's soon after opening. It opened in March 1990 with approximately 110 stores, and had an estimated 80,000 customers in its first weekend of business. McCurdy's opened as a fourth anchor store in 1992, which later became regional division The Bon-Ton. The mall was an early success and remained moderately popular until it was shuttered.

Target opened on an outparcel in 2007.

Congel era 
In 2007, the center was purchased by Scott R. Congel, a former principal with The Pyramid Companies of Syracuse. The sale triggered speculation that the surrounding property may be further developed. Congel announced a large 421-room hotel, 330 condominium units and a 16-screen movie theater would be part of the project, along with retail, restaurant and office space and an underground parking garage.

The recession hit financing before any work began. With the exception of Sears and Macy's anchoring either end of the mall, the mall shuttered in February 2009 for further development.

References

See also 
Midtown Plaza
Eastview Mall
The Marketplace Mall
The Mall at Greece Ridge

Shopping malls in New York (state)
Shopping malls established in 1990
shopping malls disestablished in 2009
1990 establishments in New York (state)
2009 disestablishments in New York (state)
Abandoned shopping malls in the United States
Defunct shopping malls in the United States
Commercial buildings in Rochester, New York